Gombaz may refer to:
 Gombaz, Fars
 Gombaz, Sistan and Baluchestan